DeForest Stull (April 21, 1885 – December 10, 1938) was an American football and basketball coach and geography professor. He served as the head men's basketball coach at Northern Michigan University from 1910 to 1915.

References

1885 births
1938 deaths
Basketball coaches from Michigan
Coe Kohawks football players
Northern Michigan Wildcats football coaches
Northern Michigan Wildcats men's basketball coaches
People from Richmond, Michigan
Players of American football from Michigan
Sportspeople from Metro Detroit